Caple is a surname. Notable people with the surname include:

Chris Caple, British academic
Christopher Caple (1559–1626), English politician
Ian Caple, English recording engineer
Jim Caple (21st century), American journalist
Natalee Caple (born 1970), Canadian author
Nigel Caple, British artist
Robert Caple (b. 1939), English cricketer
Stephen Caple (b. 1984), English cricketer
Tim Caple (21st century), British television commentator

See also

Calle (name)
CAPLE (Centro de Avaliação de Português Língua Estrangeira or Centre for Evaluation of Portuguese Language), an exam of European Portuguese as a second language 
Caples (disambiguation)
Carle, surnames
Carle (given name)

English-language surnames